Castiarina vegeta is a beetle (Order Coleoptera) in the Family Buprestidae, otherwise known as jewel beetles. The species was described by Hope in 1847.

Distribution
South Australia, Victoria.

Citation
Castiarina vegeta

References
Barker, S., 2006: Castiarina: Australia's richest jewel beetle genus. Australian Biological Resources Study, 2006. 

Notes

External links
 http://bie.ala.org.au/species/Castiarina+vegeta#
 https://sites.google.com/site/buprestidpages/castiarina-vegeta

vegeta
Beetles of Australia
Fauna of Victoria (Australia)